Troussures is a former commune in the Oise department in northern France. On 1 January 2017, it was merged into the commune Auneuil. The château of Troussures shelters a priory of Community of St. John who organizes sessions and spiritual retreats.

See also
 Communes of the Oise department

References

Former communes of Oise
Populated places disestablished in 2017